Kuldar is an Estonian-language male given name.

People named Kuldar include:
 Kuldar Sikk (born 1979), Estonian rally co-driver
 Kuldar Sink (1942–1995), Estonian composer and flautist

References

Estonian masculine given names